Symphony No. 31 may refer to:

 Symphony No. 31 (Haydn)
 Symphony No. 31 (Michael Haydn)
 Symphony No. 31 (Mozart)

031